Michael Edwin Bruhert (born June 21, 1951) is a former Major League Baseball pitcher. He is the former son-in-law of former New York Mets manager Gil Hodges.

Bruhert attended Christ the King Regional High School in Middle Village, Queens where he won only one game as a pitcher in four seasons. After high school, he worked scooping ice cream at a local Carvel and played for a local sandlot team. Bruhert found enough success in the Queens-Nassau Summer League to land a tryout at Shea Stadium, after which he signed with the New York Mets.

Shortly after joining the Mets, he began dating Gil Hodges' daughter, Irene. The two were engaged by the time Bruhert was selected by the Philadelphia Phillies in the Rule 5 draft on November 27, . Following Spring training , he was returned to the Mets.

After seven seasons in the Mets' farm system, in which he went 38–51 with a 3.69 earned run average, Bruhert made his major league debut in the second game of a doubleheader with the Montreal Expos on April 9, . He pitched six strong innings, allowing only one earned run (two unearned), however, he took the loss. He earned his first win in his next start against the St. Louis Cardinals. His finest performance was a complete game shutout of the Phillies on September 17, in which he struck out five and allowed just four hits.

For the season, Bruhert went 4–11 with a 4.78 ERA and 56 strikeouts. He was traded to the Texas Rangers in  along with Bob Myrick for star pitcher Dock Ellis. Bruhert went 9–10 with a 5.58 ERA in the Rangers' farm system, but never reached the majors.

Shortly afterwards, he became pitching coach at Fordham University.

He served in the United States Army Reserve in the early 1970s.

References

External links

Mike Bruhert at Baseball Almanac
Pura Pelota

1951 births
Living people
Águilas del Zulia players
Charleston Charlies players
Columbus Clippers players
Jackson Mets players
Major League Baseball pitchers
Marion Mets players
Navegantes del Magallanes players
American expatriate baseball players in Venezuela
New York Mets players
People from Jamaica, Queens
Pompano Beach Mets players
Tidewater Tides players
Tigres de Aragua players
Tucson Toros players
Visalia Mets players
Wichita Aeros players
Fordham Rams baseball coaches
Sportspeople from Queens, New York
Baseball players from New York City
United States Army soldiers
United States Army reservists